Deanna Sirlin (born March 7, 1958) is an American contemporary artist best known for her large-scale installations and paintings. Sirlin's art has been shown all over the world and includes massive installations that dominate entire buildings in Venice, Italy, Atlanta, Georgia, London, England, Antalya, Turkey, New Orleans, Louisiana and Evora,Portugal.

Education
Born in Brooklyn, New York, Sirlin attended the Brooklyn Museum Art School and earned a BA in Art from the State University of New York at Albany (1978). While at SUNY, Sirlin studied painting under Mark Greenwald and art history with Ann Sutherland Harris. Sirlin earned an MFA in Painting from Queens College, City University of New York (1980), where she studied under artists Gabriel Laderman, Charles Cajori, Benny Andrews, and Clinton Hill, and art critic Robert Pincus-Witten.

Exhibitions
2022 Borders of Light and Water, Palazzo Bembo, European Cultural Centre, Venice, Italy (as part of the 59th Biennale)
2022 Watermark, Crosland Library, Georgia  Institute of Technology, Atlanta, Georgia
2022 Wavelength, Chastain Arts Center, OCA City of Atlanta, Georgia
2020 Strata, Fundação Eugénio de Almeida, Évora, Portugal 
2019 Variation, Alpharetta Arts Center, Alpharetta, Georgia
2018 Translucence, Gallery 72, Office of Cultural Affairs, City of Atlanta, Georgia 
2015 Upended, Neuer Worpsweder Kunstverein, Worpswede, Germany
2012 Emergency Orange, M55 Gallery Art, New York City, New York
2012 Under and Over: New Collages, The Art Collaborative, Atlanta, Georgia 
2009 Everything is Optional, Whitespace Gallery, Atlanta, Georgia
2006 Circling, Centre for Recent Drawing, London, UK 
2006 Red Eye Love, Plus Gallery, Denver Colorado
2006 Notes to Self, Ferst Center for the Arts, Georgia Tech, Atlanta Georgia
2005 It’s All In My Head, Hartsfield- Jackson International Airport, Atlanta Georgia 
2005 Up to My Eyeballs, Ty Stokes Gallery, Atlanta, Georgia
2004 Gestures, Antalya Cultur Centre, Antalya. Turkey 
2004 New Work, Ty Stokes Gallery, Atlanta, Georgia
2003 New Work, Saltworks Gallery, Atlanta, Georgia
2002 The Arrangement of Things, Coach Gallery, Atlanta, Georgia
2001 Punto di Fuga [Vanishing Point], Universita Ca’ Foscari Venezia, Venice, Italy 
2000 After Painting, Laredo Center for the Arts, Laredo, Texas
1999 Retracings, High Museum of Art, Atlanta, Georgia
1999 Retracing Retracing, Resource Forum, Atlanta, Georgia 
1999 Into the Blue, Solomon Projects, Atlanta, Georgia
1998 In Retrospect: Paintings From the Last Decade, Buckhead Plaza, Atlanta 
1996 Quaternity, The Contemporary Art Center, Atlanta, Georgia
1995 Forecasts, Fay Gold Gallery, Atlanta, Georgia traveled to Cheekwood Fine Arts Center, Nashville, Tennessee, and the Hudgins Center, Duluth, Georgia
1994 Between Heaven and Earth, The Autrey Mill Project, Alpharetta, Georgia. 
1993 Deanna Sirlin: Paintings, Fay Gold Gallery, Atlanta, Georgia
1989 Deanna Sirlin: Paintings, Georgia Institute of Technology, Atlanta, Georgia 
1988 Deanna Sirlin: Paintings, Art Institute of Pittsburgh, Pennsylvania
1987 Deanna Sirlin: Paintings, Omni Gallery, Atlanta, Georgia 
1987 Deanna Sirlin: Paintings, Berry College, Rome, Georgia
1986 Deanna Sirlin: Paintings, Philip Morris Gallery, Richmond, Virginia 
1986 Deanna Sirlin: Paintings, Catholic University, Washington, D.C. 
1985 Deanna Sirlin: Paintings, Sarah Y. Rentschler Gallery, New York City 
1985 Deanna Sirlin: Paintings, Long Island University Gallery, Brooklyn, New York 
1985 Deanna Sirlin: Paintings, Foundation Gallery, Norfolk, Virginia
1983 Deanna Sirlin: Paintings, Arnot Art Museum, Elmira, New York
1993 Deanna Sirlin: Paintings, The Studio School and Gallery, Johnson City, New York 
1981 Deanna Sirlin: Paintings, Smedley's Gallery, Ithaca, New York

Installations
Sirlin is perhaps best known for her pivotal installation "Retracings," which encompassed virtually the entire glass front of Atlanta's High Museum of Art in 1999. She is included in the High Museum of Arts permanent collection.

Writing 
Sirlin is the editor-in-chief of The Art Section, an online arts and culture journal that has been publishing since 2007. She wrote for ART PAPERS magazine between 1993 and 2007. She was the weekly art critic for Creative Loafing in 2010. She has written art reviews for Arts ATL since 2017. Her book "She's Got What It Takes: American Women Artists in Dialogue" was published by Charta Books in 2013. The book was reviewed by Andrew Alexander for Creative Loafing magazine. Sirlin received a Creative Capital Warhol Foundation Award for Art Writing in 2010 mentored under Hayden Herrera.

Grants and honors
2020   Grant, United States Artists, Chicago, IL
2020   Grant, Georgia Chapter of  The National Museum of Women in the Arts. Washington, DC
2019	Artist in Residence, Cini Foundation, Venice, Italy
2019	Artist in Residence, City of Alpharetta, Georgia
2019	Individual Artist Grant, Fulton County Arts Council, Georgia
2017	Individual Artist Grant, Fulton County Arts Council, Georgia
2016	United States Department of State, Grant
2016	Rothko Foundation International Painting Symposium Artist in Residence
2012	Mini-Grant, City of Milton, Georgia to make art with the community
2010	Creative Capital Warhol Foundation Award for Art Writing
2009	Artist in Residence, Padies Chateau, Lempaut, France
2008	Fulton County Arts Council, Small And Emerging Arts Organizations Grant
2002	Artist in Residence, Nürnberg, Germany
2002	Artist in Residence, Kunsthaus Project- Heidenheim, Germany
2002	Artist in Communities Grant, Fulton County Arts Council, Atlanta
1999	Artist's Grant, CGR Advisors, Atlanta, Georgia
1997	Honoree for Visual Arts by Secretary of State, Georgia
1996	Artist's Grant, Arts Festival, [as part of the 1996 Olympics] Atlanta, Georgia
1994	Individual Artist Grant, Georgia Council for the Arts
1994	Artist's Grant, Fulton County Arts Council, Georgia
1992	Independent Artist Grant, Fulton County Arts Council, Georgia
1992	Artist Project Grant, BCA, City of Atlanta
1987	Artists’ Space Grant, New York City
1983	Artist Residency Yaddo Foundation, Saratoga Springs, New York

Selected collections 

 Larson-Juhl, Atlanta, Georgia
 General Electric
 Atlanta Contemporary Art Center, Atlanta, Georgia
 Macon Museum of Arts and Sciences, Macon, Georgia 
 Agnes Scott College, Decatur, Georgia 
 Mark Rothko Centre, Daugavpils, Latvia
 Shenzhen Institute of Fine Arts, Shenzhen, PR China
 Universita Ca’ Foscari Venezia, Venice, Italy
 Kunsthaus Nürnberg, Nürnberg, Germany
 High Museum of Art, Atlanta, Georgia
 Museum of Contemporary Art of Georgia, Atlanta, Georgia
 Atlanta Gas Light, Atlanta, Georgia
 Georgia Pacific, Atlanta, Georgia
 United Airlines, Dulles Airport, Washington, D.C.
 CSX Corporation, Richmond, Virginia
 Southern Progress Corporation, Birmingham, Alabama
 THW and Associates, San Diego, California
 Penny McCall Foundation, New York, New York
 McKinsey and Co., Atlanta, Georgia
 Egleston Children's Hospital, Atlanta, Georgia
 Citihome Developers, Atlanta, Georgia
 Troutman-Sanders, Atlanta, Georgia
 Childress Klein, Atlanta, Georgia
 Aon Hewitt, Atlanta, Georgia
 Colorchrome, Atlanta, Georgia
 Casas, Benjamin, and White, LLC, Atlanta, Georgia
 Wells Corporation, Minneapolis, Minnesota
 Georgia Power, Atlanta, Georgia
 Hartsfield Jackson International Airport, Atlanta, Georgia
 Herman Miller, Atlanta, Georgia
 Pope and Land, Atlanta, Georgia
 Cousins Properties, Atlanta, Georgia

References

External links
Official Site
The Art Section art journal
ART PAPERS magazine
Deanna Sirlin entry at Museum of Contemporary Art of Georgia website
Deanna Sirlin entry at Geoform website
Article about Deanna Sirlin from the Telegraph newspaper, London, 2006

Living people
1958 births
American glass artists
Women glass artists
American designers
Artists from Brooklyn
Artists from New York City
American art critics
University at Albany, SUNY alumni
Queens College, City University of New York alumni
American women journalists
American women critics
Journalists from New York City
Painters from Georgia (U.S. state)
Artists from Atlanta
Artists from Georgia (U.S. state)
21st-century American women